Whaleback Light is a historic lighthouse marking the mouth of the Piscataqua River in Kittery, Maine.  It is located on a rocky outcrop offshore southwest of Fort Foster and south of Wood Island in Kittery.  The present tower was built in 1872. It was listed on the National Register of Historic Places in 1988.

History
The station (known in early records as "Whales Back") was first established in 1830 for $20,000. The tower was upgraded in 1855 with a new lantern and a fourth order Fresnel lens. A fog bell and tower were installed in 1863. In 1869, storms had caused cracks in the tower and foundation causing the decision to build a new tower in 1872. The new tower, still standing today, was built with dovetailed granite blocks alongside the original tower, which was removed in 1880.

At some point the fog bell was replaced with a horn and in 1991, the volume of the horn was reduced because it was damaging the integrity of the structure.  The light was automated in 1963.

The current lighthouse exhibits two white flashes every 10 seconds and is created by a modern VLB-44 LED light, which was installed in October 2009.

In 2007, under the National Lighthouse Preservation Act of 2000, Whaleback lighthouse was made available to a suitable new steward.  The American Lighthouse Foundation and its chapter Friends of Portsmouth Harbor Lighthouses submitted an application and in November 2008, became the new owners.

Keepers 
Samuel E. Haskell (1831–1839)
Joseph L. Locke (1839–1840)
Zachariah Chickering (1840)
John Kennard (1840)
Joseph D. Currier (1841)
Eliphalet Grover (1841–1843)
J. Prentiss Locke (1843-unknown)
Richard R. Lock (c. 1847)
Jedediah Rand (1849–1853)
Reuben T. Leavitt (1853–1859)
Oliver P. Tucker (1859–1860)
Gustavus A. Abbott (1860–1861)
Joel P. Reynolds (1861–1864)
Edward Parks (assistant, 1863–1864)
Nathaniel P. Campbell (1864)
Ambrose Card (assistant, then keeper 1864)
Gilbert Amee (assistant 1864, then keeper 1864-1869)
Mrs. M. M. Amee (assistant, 1864–1867)
Isaac W. Chauncy (assistant, 1867–1868)
James W. Verney (1869–1871)
Ferdinand Barr (assistant 1868-1871, became keeper 3/22/1871)
Emily F. Barr (assistant, 1871)
William H. Caswell (1871–1872)
Frank P. Caswell (assistant, 1871–1872)
Chandler Martin (1872–1878)
George R. Frost (assistant, 1872–1873)
Frank L. Chauncey (assistant, 1873 and 1876–1880)
John L. A. Martin (assistant 1874-1876)
Leander White (1878–1887)
John W. Lewis (assistant 1880-1882)
Brackett Lewis (assistant 1883-1885)
Ellison C. White (assistant 1885-1887, principal keeper 1887-1888)
James M. Haley (1888–1893)
Daniel Stevens (assistant 1887-1890)
John W. Robinson (assistant 1890-1892)
James Haley (Jr.?) (assistant 1892-1893)
Walter S. Amee (1893–1921)
Wallace S, Chase (assistant 1893-1894)
Alvah J. Tobey (assistant 1894-1899)
Joseph A. Pruett (assistant 1896-1897)
John W. Wetzel (assistant 1897-1924)
John P. Brooks (assistant, 1899–1915)
Arnold B. White (1921–1941)
W. A. Alley (c. 1935)
Maynard F. Farnsworth (c. 1922-1940s)
Charles U. Gardner (relief keeper, c, 1942–1943)
Morgan W. Willis (1948-1950)
Francis D. Hickey (Coast Guard, c. 1956-1957)
Robert Brann (Coast Guard, c. 1957)
Stephen H. Rogers (USCG, c. 1957-1958)
James Pope (Coast Guard, c. early 1960s)

Gallery

See also
National Register of Historic Places listings in York County, Maine

References

External links
Friends of Portsmouth Harbor Lighthouses
American Lighthouse Foundation

Lighthouses completed in 1829
Lighthouses completed in 1872
Lighthouses on the National Register of Historic Places in Maine
Lighthouses in York County, Maine
National Register of Historic Places in York County, Maine